Huey-Kang Sytwu is a medical researcher and administrator.

Career 
He is the Vice President of the National Health Research Institutes (NHRI) and a Distinguished Investigator at the NHRI's National Institute of Infectious Diseases and Vaccinology.

In 2022 he was elected to the Academia Sinica.

References

Members of Academia Sinica
Year of birth missing (living people)
Living people
Place of birth missing (living people)